The 1480s decade ran from January 1, 1480, to December 31, 1489.

Significant people
 Robert Henryson

References